Julian Ryerson (born 17 November 1997) is a Norwegian professional footballer who plays as a right-back for  club Borussia Dortmund and the Norway national team.

Career 
Ryerson signed for Viking from Lyngdal IL in the summer of 2013. He got his breakthrough for the first-team in the 2016 season, when he played 18 matches in the league. Ryerson played primarily right-back in those matches.

He was also capped for Norway's U-18, U-19 and U-21 national teams.

In July 2018, Ryerson joined 2. Bundesliga side 1. FC Union Berlin on a three-year deal until 2021.

On 17 January 2023, Dortmund announced they had signed Ryerson to replace the injured Thomas Meunier. His contract will run to June 2026.

Personal life
Ryerson's father was born in the United States, and his mother was born in Norway. His cousin is Norwegian football player Mathias Rasmussen.

Career statistics

Club

International

References

External links
Profile at the Borussia Dortmund website

1997 births
Living people
People from Lyngdal
Norwegian people of American descent
Sportspeople from Agder
Norwegian footballers
Association football defenders
Norway international footballers
Norway under-21 international footballers
Norway youth international footballers
Eliteserien players
Norwegian First Division players
2. Bundesliga players
Bundesliga players
Viking FK players
1. FC Union Berlin players
Borussia Dortmund players
Norwegian expatriate footballers
Norwegian expatriate sportspeople in Germany
Expatriate footballers in Germany